Constanza National Airport (also known as Expedición 14 de Junio National Airport)  is an airport for domestic flights serving Constanza, a town in the La Vega Province of the Dominican Republic.

After undergoing renovations, it was reopened in May 2006 and renamed Expedicón 14 de Junio National Airport. It serves mostly tourist and cargo carriers.

There is rising terrain in all quadrants.

Airlines and destinations 
The following airlines offer scheduled passenger service:

See also

Transport in Dominican Republic
List of airports in Dominican Republic

References

External links
OpenStreetMap - Aeropuerto 14 de Junio
FallingRain - Expedición 14 de Junio National Airport
SkyVector - Constanza Airport

Airports in the Dominican Republic
Buildings and structures in La Vega Province